Styliani ("Stella") Tsikouna ( also written Stiliani Tsikouna, born October 19, 1972 in Chalcis) is a Greek discus thrower.

Her personal best throw is 65.25 metres, achieved in May 2004 in Iraklio. This ranks her third among Greek discus throwers, only behind Ekaterini Voggoli and Anastasia Kelesidou.

Achievements

References

sports-reference

1972 births
Living people
Greek female discus throwers
Athletes (track and field) at the 1996 Summer Olympics
Athletes (track and field) at the 2000 Summer Olympics
Athletes (track and field) at the 2004 Summer Olympics
Olympic athletes of Greece
UTEP Miners women's track and field athletes
Sportspeople from Chalcis
Mediterranean Games silver medalists for Greece
Mediterranean Games medalists in athletics
Athletes (track and field) at the 1997 Mediterranean Games